Madhya Pradesh State Highway 15 (MP SH 15) is a State Highway running from Jabalpur city via Patan, Tendukheda, Rehli, Sagar, Sultanganj, Silwani, Bareli, Shahganj and terminating near Budhni town in Sehore district of Madhya Pradesh.
It is an important state highway which connects important towns of South-Eastern, North-Eastern and Central Madhya Pradesh.

See also
List of state highways in Madhya Pradesh

References

State Highways in Madhya Pradesh